Mohan Ponnusamy (30 December 1949 – 30 October 2009) was an Indian politician and a member of the state unit of the Communist Party of India (Marxist) (CPI(M)). He was a member of the 13th Lok Sabha and 14th Lok Sabha, representing the Madurai constituency of Tamil Nadu as a candidate of the CPI(M). He died on 30 October 2009.

Mohan was active in the student movement before he joined the Party in 1973. He worked as the District Secretary of the Democratic Youth Federation of India in Madurai later on. He served as the Secretary of the Madurai Urban district of the Party for 16 years. He was a member of the Tamil Nadu State Committee of the CPI(M) for the past 25 years. In a dispute over Madurai District Hospital he was attacked by the police and had to be hospitalized for a long time.

References

External links
 Members of Fourteenth Lok Sabha - Parliament of India website

Politicians from Madurai
Indian Tamil people
Lok Sabha members from Tamil Nadu
1949 births
2009 deaths
India MPs 1999–2004
India MPs 2004–2009
Communist Party of India (Marxist) politicians from Tamil Nadu
Tamil Nadu politicians